José Zaldo (c. 1790 – c. 1855) was one of two interim mayors of Ponce, Puerto Rico, after the death of mayor Salvador de Vives. Antonio Corro was the first interim mayor, followed by José Zaldo, who was interim mayor until 31 December of that year. Corro then became mayor on 1 January 1846, and performed as mayor until 31 March 1846.

See also

 List of Puerto Ricans
 List of mayors of Ponce, Puerto Rico

References

Mayors of Ponce, Puerto Rico
1790s births
1850s deaths
Year of birth uncertain
Year of death uncertain